The Directors Guild of America Award for Outstanding Directorial Achievement in Reality Programs is one of the annual Directors Guild of America Awards given by the Directors Guild of America. It was first awarded at the 58th Directors Guild of America Awards in 2006.

Winners and nominees

2000s

2010s

2020s

Programs with multiple awards
2 awards
 MasterChef

Programs with multiple nominations

11 nominations
 The Amazing Race

4 nominations
 MasterChef

3 nominations
 American Ninja Warrior
 Fear Factor
 Pros vs. Joes
 The Biggest Loser
 The Next Iron Chef
 Shark Tank

2 nominations
 America's Next Top Model
 The Chef Show
 Encore!
 Full Bloom
 Lego Masters
 Live PD
 Running Wild with Bear Grylls
 Steve Austin's Broken Skull Challenge
 Top Chef

Individuals with multiple awards
2 awards
 Tony Croll
 Neil P. DeGroot
 Adam Vetri

Individuals with multiple nominations

12 nominations
 Bertram van Munster

7 nominations
 J. Rupert Thompson

5 nominations
 Brian Smith

4 nominations
 Tony Croll
 Neil P. DeGroot
 Eytan Keller
 Adam Vetri 

3 nominations
 Hisham Abed
 Ken Fuchs
 Joseph Guidry
 Patrick McManus
 Tony Sacco

2 nominations
 Jon Favreau
 Rich Kim
 Ben Simms

Total awards by network
 NBC – 4
 Fox – 3
 Discovery Channel – 2
 CBS – 1
 CMT – 1
 CW – 1
 Disney+ – 1
 Food Network – 1
 HBO Max – 1
 NatGeo – 1
 Netflix – 1
 Starz – 1
 TNT – 1

References

External links
 Official DGA website

Directors Guild of America Awards